Garrey Wynd (born 31 October 1946) is a former Australian rules footballer who played with Melbourne in the Victorian Football League (VFL).

Wynd, a centreman, was recruited from Camperdown. He made just two appearances for Melbourne, in the 1966 VFL season, against Collingwood at Victoria Park and Footscray at Western Oval.

He then went on to play with Prahran in the Victorian Football Association.

Two sons, Paul and Scott, played in the Australian Football League, the latter a Brownlow Medallist.

References

1946 births
Australian rules footballers from Victoria (Australia)
Melbourne Football Club players
Prahran Football Club players
Camperdown Football Club players
Living people